Magnolia is a borough in Camden County, in the U.S. state of New Jersey. As of the 2020 United States census, the borough's population was 4,352, an increase of 11 (+0.3%) from the 2010 census count of 4,341, which in turn reflected a decline of 68 (−1.5%) from the 4,409 counted in the 2000 census.

History

Magnolia was incorporated as a borough by an act of the New Jersey Legislature on April 14, 1915, from portions of the now-defunct Centre Township, and parts of Clementon, based on the results of a referendum held on May 12, 1915. The borough was named for magnolia trees that grow in the area.

Magnolia has been the site of one of seven remaining single-arch McDonald's signs in the United States, with the bulk of signs in the nation matching the company's trademarked Golden Arches.

Geography
According to the United States Census Bureau, the borough had a total area of 0.98 square miles (2.53 km2), all of which was land.

The borough borders the Camden County municipalities of Barrington, Gloucester Township, Lawnside, Runnemede and Somerdale.

Demographics

2010 census

The Census Bureau's 2006–2010 American Community Survey showed that (in 2010 inflation-adjusted dollars) median household income was $53,125 (with a margin of error of +/− $7,496) and the median family income was $74,042 (+/− $10,349). Males had a median income of $49,196 (+/− $2,966) versus $38,523 (+/− $5,667) for females. The per capita income for the borough was $27,896 (+/− $1,765). About 1.0% of families and 4.7% of the population were below the poverty line, including 3.8% of those under age 18 and none of those age 65 or over.

2000 census
As of the 2000 United States census there were 4,409 people, 1,710 households, and 1,162 families residing in the borough. The racial makeup of the borough was 77.00% White, 17.80% African American, 0.23% Native American, 0.93% Asian, 0.02% Pacific Islander, 1.54% from other races, and 2.47% from two or more races. Hispanic or Latino of any race were 4.06% of the population.

There were 1,710 households, out of which 30.6% had children under the age of 18 living with them, 48.4% were married couples living together, 15.1% had a female householder with no husband present, and 32.0% were non-families. 25.7% of all households were made up of individuals, and 8.4% had someone living alone who was 65 years of age or older. The average household size was 2.57 and the average family size was 3.12.

In the borough the population was spread out, with 24.7% under the age of 18, 7.9% from 18 to 24, 33.2% from 25 to 44, 21.4% from 45 to 64, and 12.8% who were 65 years of age or older. The median age was 36 years. For every 100 females, there were 93.8 males. For every 100 females age 18 and over, there were 87.8 males.

The median income for a household in the borough was $43,728, and the median income for a family was $50,791. Males had a median income of $38,480 versus $27,172 for females. The per capita income for the borough was $19,032. About 5.9% of families and 7.9% of the population were below the poverty line, including 10.9% of those under age 18 and 5.0% of those age 65 or over.

Government

Local government

Magnolia is governed under the Borough form of New Jersey municipal government, one of 218 municipalities (of the 564) statewide that use this form, the state's most common form of government. The governing body is comprised of a Mayor and a Borough Council, with all positions elected at-large on a partisan basis as part of the November general election. A Mayor is elected directly by the voters to a four-year term of office. The Borough Council is comprised of six members elected to serve three-year terms on a staggered basis, with two seats coming up for election each year in a three-year cycle. The Borough form of government used by Magnolia is a "weak mayor / strong council" government in which council members act as the legislative body with the mayor presiding at meetings and voting only in the event of a tie. The mayor can veto ordinances subject to an override by a two-thirds majority vote of the council. The mayor makes committee and liaison assignments for council members, and most appointments are made by the mayor with the advice and consent of the council.

, the Mayor of the Borough of Magnolia is Democrat BettyAnn Cowling-Carson, whose term of office ends December 31, 2023. Members of the Magnolia Borough Council are Council President Mary F. Martz (D, 2023), Paula Bonamassa (D, 2022), Anthony DePrince III (D, 2022), Shawn Parker (2024), Steve Whalen (D, 2023) and Shelley Wilson (D, 2024; appointed to serve an unexpired term).

In February 2022, the Borough Council appointed Shelley Wilson to fill the seat expiring in December 2024 that had been held by Richard Krause until he resigned from office the previous month shortly after beginning his new council term. Wilson will serve on an interim basis until the November 2022 general election, when voters will choose a candidate to serve the remainder of the term of office.

Federal, state and county representation
Magnolia is located in the 1st Congressional District and is part of New Jersey's 5th state legislative district.

Politics
As of March 2011, there were a total of 2,918 registered voters in Magnolia, of which 1,170 (40.1%) were registered as Democrats, 367 (12.6%) were registered as Republicans and 1,381 (47.3%) were registered as Unaffiliated. There were no voters registered to other parties.

In the 2012 presidential election, Democrat Barack Obama received 69.8% of the vote (1,383 cast), ahead of Republican Mitt Romney with 29.3% (580 votes), and other candidates with 0.9% (18 votes), among the 2,002 ballots cast by the borough's 3,162 registered voters (21 ballots were spoiled), for a turnout of 63.3%. In the 2008 presidential election, Democrat Barack Obama received 66.2% of the vote (1,442 cast), ahead of Republican John McCain, who received around 30.1% (656 votes), with 2,177 ballots cast among the borough's 2,877 registered voters, for a turnout of 75.7%. In the 2004 presidential election, Democrat John Kerry received 60.7% of the vote (1,293 ballots cast), outpolling Republican George W. Bush, who received around 37.3% (795 votes), with 2,129 ballots cast among the borough's 2,887 registered voters, for a turnout percentage of 73.7.

In the 2013 gubernatorial election, Republican Chris Christie received 53.3% of the vote (555 cast), ahead of Democrat Barbara Buono with 44.9% (468 votes), and other candidates with 1.8% (19 votes), among the 1,070 ballots cast by the borough's 3,196 registered voters (28 ballots were spoiled), for a turnout of 33.5%. In the 2009 gubernatorial election, Democrat Jon Corzine received 53.7% of the vote (640 ballots cast), ahead of both Republican Chris Christie with 37.2% (443 votes) and Independent Chris Daggett with 5.3% (63 votes), with 1,191 ballots cast among the borough's 2,942 registered voters, yielding a 40.5% turnout.

Education
The Magnolia School District serves public school students in pre-kindergarten through eighth grade at Magnolia School. As of the 2018–19 school year, the district, comprised of one school, had an enrollment of 408 students and 39.1 classroom teachers (on an FTE basis), for a student–teacher ratio of 10.4:1.

For ninth through twelfth grades, public school students attend Sterling High School, a regional high school serving students from Magnolia, Somerdale, Stratford, along with students from Hi-Nella and Laurel Springs who attend as part of sending/receiving relationships. The high school is located in Somerdale. As of the 2018–19 school year, the high school had an enrollment of 958 students and 69.8 classroom teachers (on an FTE basis), for a student–teacher ratio of 13.7:1.

Transportation

Roads and highways

U.S. Route 30 (White Hors Pike) is the main highway serving Magnolia. County Route 544 also traverses the borough.

Public transportation
NJ Transit offers bus service between Turnersville and Camden on the 403 route.

Notable people

People who were born in, residents of, or otherwise closely associated with Magnolia include:

 Kristin Hunter (1931–2008), author best known for her first novel, God Bless the Child, published in 1964
 Olamide Zaccheaus (born 1997), American football wide receiver for the Atlanta Falcons of the National Football League

References

External links

 Magnolia Borough municipal website

 
1915 establishments in New Jersey
Borough form of New Jersey government
Boroughs in Camden County, New Jersey
Populated places established in 1915